Kevin Bigler (born 5 October 1992) is a Swiss former footballer.

References

1992 births
People from Bern-Mittelland District
Living people
Swiss men's footballers
Association football defenders
FC Thun players
FC Biel-Bienne players
Swiss 1. Liga (football) players
Swiss Super League players
2. Liga Interregional players
Swiss Challenge League players
Sportspeople from the canton of Bern